The 12th Indiana Infantry Regiment was an infantry regiment in the Union Army between May 11, 1861, and May 14, 1862, during the American Civil War.

Service 
The 12th Indiana Infantry was organized at Indianapolis, Indiana May 11, 1861, and mustered in for one year's service; it was transferred to U.S. service on July 18, 1861. The regiment was attached to Abercrombie's Brigade, Banks' Department of the Shenandoah, to October 1861. Abercrombie's Brigade, Bank's Division, Army of the Potomac, to March 1862. 2nd Brigade, Williams' 1st Division, Banks' V Corps, to April 1862, and Department of the Shenandoah to May 1862.

Detailed service 
Moved to Evansville, Indiana, June 11. Left Indiana for Baltimore, Maryland, July 23; then moved to Sandy Hook, Maryland, July 28. Duty at Harpers Ferry, Virginia, Williamsport, and Sharpsburg, Maryland, until March 1862. Advance on Winchester, Virginia, March 1–12. Skirmished at Stephenson's Station, near Winchester, March 11. Operations in the Shenandoah Valley until April. Duty at Warrenton Junction, Virginia, April 3-May 5. Reconnaissance to Rappahannock River and skirmish at Rappahannock Crossing April 18. March to Washington, D.C., May 5.

Casualties 
The regiment lost a total of 24 enlisted men, all due to disease.

See also 

 List of Indiana Civil War regiments
 Indiana in the Civil War

References

Bibliography 
 Dyer, Frederick H. (1959). A Compendium of the War of the Rebellion. New York and London. Thomas Yoseloff, Publisher. .
 Holloway, William R. (2004). Civil War Regiments From Indiana. eBookOnDisk.com Pensacola, Florida. .
 Terrell, W.H.H. (1867). The Report of the Adjutant General  of the State of Indiana. Containing Rosters for the Years 1861–1865, Volume 7. Indianapolis, Indiana. Samuel M. Douglass, State Printer.

Military units and formations established in 1861
Military units and formations disestablished in 1865
Units and formations of the Union Army from Indiana
1861 establishments in Indiana